The Roman Catholic Diocese of Roermond is a diocese of the Latin Church of the Catholic Church, located in the Netherlands. The diocese is one of the seven suffragan dioceses in the ecclesiastical province of the Metropolitan Archbishop of Utrecht. The territory of the diocese covers the Province of Limburg.

Its cathedral episcopal see is the Cathedral of St. Christopher in Roermond.

The Dean of Roermond is responsible for the parishes in that city and a few other municipalities in the diocese.

History 
Originally established on 12 May 1559, on territories split off from the Metropolitan Archdiocese of Cologne (Keulen, now in Germany) and Diocese of Liège (Luik, now in Belgium).

During the Napoleonic era, on 1801.07.15 it lost territory to establish the Apostolic Vicariate of Grave–Nijmegen, on 1801.11.29 the diocese was suppressed, its territory being divided between the above vicariate and to establish the (German) Diocese of Aachen (Aix-la-Chapelle).

It was re-established in 1840 by the Holy See as (pre-diocesan) Apostolic Vicariate of Limburg. In 1853 it was promoted as Diocese of Roermond and gained territory from the Belgian Diocese of Liège.

During the sixties of the twentieth century, the relatively strong demarcation between the Catholic south on one side and the Calvinist west and north on the other side of the Netherlands started to diminish. In the second half of the twentieth century a rapid secularization and strong loss of religious affiliation have taken place in Limburg.

Statistics and population 
The diocese has roughly 817,000 registered Roman Catholics (about 72.3% of the population of Limburg). Roughly 3 percent of the population in the Diocese Roermond attends Mass on Sundays  (as per official Church (KASKI) data). The Roermond diocese is one of the two in the Netherlands that is in a majority-Catholic region, as per the most recent KASKI data.

As per 2014, it pastorally served 1,091,000 Catholics (96.0% of 1,136,000 total) on 2,209 km² in 303 parishes with 471 priests (219 diocesan, 252 religious), 71 deacons, 1,210 lay religious (440 brothers, 770 sisters) and 24 seminarians.

Limburg is mostly Roman Catholic by tradition and still uses the term and certain traditions as a base for its cultural identity, though the vast majority of the population is now largely irreligious in practice. Research among Dutch Catholics in 2006 shows that only 27% of the Dutch Catholics can be regarded as a theist, 55% as an ietsist / agnostic theist and 17% as agnostic.

Episcopal Ordinaries 
Suffragan Bishops (first diocese)
Willem Damasus Van der Lindt (1562–1588)
Hendrik van Cuyk (1596–1609)
Jacobus a Castro (1611–1639)
Andreas Creusen (1651–1657)
Eugène, Count d'Allamont (1659–1666)
Lancelot de Gottignies (1670–1673)
Reginald Cools, O.P. (1677–1700)
Angèle, Count d'Ongnies et d'Estrees, O.F.M. Cap. (1701–1722)
François-Louis Sanguessa, O.F.M. (1722–1741)
Jan-Baptist de Castillion (1742-1743)
Joseph Anselme François Werbrouck (1743–1746)
Jean-Antoine de Robiano (1746–1769)
Jan Hendrik van Kerens, S.J. (1770–1775)
Philippus, Empire Count van en tot Hoensbroeck (1775–1793)
Jan, Baron van Velde tot Melroy en Sart-Bomal (1794–1801)Apostolic Vicar of Limburg 
 Joannes Augustus Paredis (1840.12.18 – 1853.03.04 see below), Titular Bishop of Hirina (1840.12.18 – 1853.03.04)Suffragan Bishops (present diocese)
Jan Augustus Paredis (see above 1853.03.04 – death 1886.06.18)
Frans Boermans (1886–1900)
Jozesh Hubertus Drehmans (1900–1913)
Lorenz Schrijnen (1914–1932)
Jozef Hubertus Willem Lemmens (1932–1958)
Jan Michiel Jozef Antoon Hanssen (1958-1958)
Pieter Jan Antoon Moors (1959–1970)
Jan Baptist Matthijs Gijsen (1972–1993)
Alphons Castermans, auxiliary (1982-1997)
Frans Jozef Maria Wiertz (1993-2017)
Everard de Jong, auxiliary (1999-)
Hendrikus Smeets (2018–present)

See also 
 Catholic Church in the Netherlands

References

Sources and external links
 GCatholic.org - data for all sections
 Website of the diocese of Roermond
 Roermond - Catholic Encyclopedia article
 Wikipedia page in Dutch about the cathedral

Roman Catholic dioceses in the Netherlands
Roman Catholic dioceses established in the 16th century
Roman Catholic dioceses and prelatures established in the 19th century
Culture of Limburg